Dowdell's Knob is a prominent mountain in Harris County, Georgia. It is often referred to as a historical spot where former U.S. President Franklin D. Roosevelt would dine occasionally. He had a brick oven and picnic area constructed on this mountain for his use during his visits to nearby Warm Springs.

The summit has the name of James and Lewis Dowdell, early settlers.

References

External links
 Dowdell's Knob historical marker

Mountains of Georgia (U.S. state)
Landforms of Harris County, Georgia